Chhoprak is a village development committee in the Gorkha District in the Gandaki Zone of northern-central Nepal. At the time of the 2011 Nepal census, it had a population of 5893 (2608 males and 3285 females) and had 1531 houses.

References

Chhoprak Church: Pastor Shiva Devkota

Populated places in Gorkha District